Omar al-Faruq (1969 – 25 September 2006), also spelled  or al-Farouq or al-Farooq, born Mahmoud Ahmad Mohammed Ahmad, was an islamic  militant with high profile connections with Al-Qaeda and Jemaah Islamiyah in Southeast Asia particularly the Philippines and Indonesia.

Biography

Al-Faruq was born in Iraq. It is believed he joined al-Qaeda in the early 1990s and trained in Afghanistan, where he became one of Osama Bin Laden's key lieutenants. U.S. authorities believed al-Faruq was planning bomb attacks on American embassies when he was captured in Bogor, Indonesia in 2002 by an Indonesian security agent who handed him over to the United States. The Al-Faruq's capture was based on information derived from the capture of Abu Zubaydah. Al-Faruq in turn revealed information about a plot to bomb embassies in  Southeast Asia, giving rise to the "yellow alert" of 10 September 2002.

He was sent to  Bagram Theater Internment Facility in Afghanistan. In July 2005, al-Faruq escaped from Bagram prison with three other al-Qaeda suspects. The U.S. authorities did not acknowledge his escape until November, when they were unable to produce him as a witness called by defense attorney Michael Waddington, in the trial of a U.S. sergeant, Alan Driver, accused of abuse at the prison.

On 25 September 2006, Al-Faruq was killed by British troops operating in the Iraqi city of Basra. The operations took place in pre-dawn hours and involved more than 200 soldiers. There were no British casualties.

References

1969 births
2006 deaths
Iraqi al-Qaeda members
Bagram Theater Internment Facility detainees